Norse Air is South African charter airline headquartered in Sandton, Johannesburg and based at Lanseria International Airport.

History
The airline started operations in 1992 and has so far operated within several countries, including South Africa, Mauritius and Afghanistan.

Destinations
Norse Air operates passenger and cargo charter services, as well as aircraft leasing and ACMI charters out of Lanseria Airport, Johannesburg.

Fleet

Current fleet 
The Norse Air fleet consists of the following aircraft:
2 Raytheon Beech King Air 200
1 Fairchild Metro 23
2 Fairchild Metro III

Historic fleet
5 Saab 340B

External links
Official website

References

Airlines established in 1992
Airlines of South Africa
Companies based in Sandton